Albin Palmlöv (born 17 December 2001) is a Swedish footballer who plays for Selånger SK.

References

Living people
2001 births
Association football midfielders
Swedish footballers
GIF Sundsvall players
Allsvenskan players